This is a summary of 1904 in music in the United Kingdom.

Events
A highly successful Elgar Festival is held at Covent Garden.
15 July – Soprano Agnes Nicholls marries conductor Hamilton Harty.
date unknown
Albert Coates makes his début as conductor of the Leipzig opera with Offenbach's The Tales of Hoffmann.
Cecil Sharp produces the first volume of his Folk Songs from Somerset.

Popular music
"Fu' The Noo", with words by. Harry Lauder & Gerald Grafton and music by Harry Lauder

Classical music: new works
Edward Elgar – Canto Popolare
Hamilton Harty – An Irish Symphony
Joseph Holbrooke – Horn Trio
Herbert Hughes – Songs of Uladh
Cyril Scott – Rhapsody for orchestra No. 1
Ralph Vaughan Williams – In the Fen Country

Opera
Frederick Delius – Koanga (premièred 30 March in Germany)

Musical theatre
5 March – The Cingalee, by Lionel Monckton, Adrian Ross and Percy Greenbank, opens at Daly's Theatre; it runs for 365 performances. 
9 September – The Catch of the Season by Seymour Hicks and Cosmo Hamilton, with music by Herbert Haines and Evelyn Baker and lyrics by Charles H. Taylor, opens at the Vaudeville Theatre; it runs for 621 performances.

Births
13 January – Richard Addinsell, composer (died 1977)
29 February – H. Hugh Bancroft, organist, choirmaster and composer (died 1988)
15 or 16 May – Eda Kersey, violinist (died 1944) 
26 May – George Formby, music hall performer, singer, actor and songwriter (died 1961)
10 August – Herbert Kennedy Andrews, organist and composer (died 1965)
23 August – William Primrose, violist (died 1982)
17 September – Sir Frederick Ashton, dancer and choreographer (died 1988)
20 October – Anna Neagle, actress and singer (died 1986)
29 October – Vivian Ellis, composer (died 1996)
30 November – Bretton Byrd, film composer (died 1959)
9 December – Elsie Randolph, actress, dancer and singer (died 1982)

Deaths
20 March – Louisa Pyne, operatic soprano and opera company manager, 75
29 April – Nellie Farren, burlesque actress and singer, 56 (heart failure)
30 May – Laura Joyce Bell, contralto singer and actress, 50
20 July – Arthur Lloyd, singer, songwriter, comedian and impresario, 65
31 October – Dan Leno, English music hall comedian, clog dancer and singer, 43

See also
 1904 in the United Kingdom

References

British Music, 1904 in
Music
British music by year
1900s in British music